Rochau is a municipality in the district of Stendal, in Saxony-Anhalt, Germany. In January 2011 it absorbed the former municipality Klein Schwechten.

References

Municipalities in Saxony-Anhalt
Stendal (district)